Hazardia may refer to:
 Hazardia (plant), a genus of flowering plants in the family Asteraceae
 Hazardia (microsporidian), a fungus genus in the division Microsporidia